Squirrel Seeks Chipmunk: A Modest Bestiary (titled Squirrel Seeks Chipmunk: A Wicked Bestiary outside the United States) is a collection of animal-themed humorous short stories by memoirist and humorist David Sedaris. The collection was published in September 2010.

Sedaris did not give the animals names, using only such names as 'chipmunk' and 'squirrel.' Animals, he said, don't need description. Sedaris said in an October 2010 interview with The Washington Post, "If I wrote, 'Phillip and Amanda had been dating for two weeks when they ran out of things to talk about', I would have to give you a whole description. But, everyone knows what a squirrel and a chipmunk look like. So, I wrote it as, 'The squirrel and the chipmunk had been dating for two weeks when they ran out of things to talk about.'"

Sedaris was inspired after reading a book of stories from South African mythology about anthropomorphic animals. Believing he could do better with a modern twist, he wrote 25 stories over two years, with the aim to ensure a high quality book by cutting ten of the 25.

Stories

Sedaris says that title character of "The Vigilant Rabbit" is based on an elderly TSA official who demanded that he remove his vest.

At least six of the stories have been read on This American Life (a US radio program to which Sedaris has been a frequent contributor): "The Cat and the Baboon," a fable about gossip and the service industry; "The Cow and the Turkey," in which barnyard animals play Secret Santa; "The Squirrel and the Chipmunk," a fable about a squirrel, a chipmunk, and a love that could never be; "Hello Kitty," in which predators and prey meet in an Alcoholics Anonymous program in prison; "The Parrot and the Potbellied Pig," about finding happiness in spite of the others' expectations; and "The Sick Rat and the Healthy Rat," about the relationship between positive thinking and physical health.

References

2010 non-fiction books
American essays
Works by David Sedaris
Little, Brown and Company books
Fables